Birds of a Feather is a 1917 American short comedy film featuring Harold Lloyd.

Cast
 Harold Lloyd as Lonesome Luke
 Snub Pollard
 Bebe Daniels
 Gilbert Pratt
 Billy Fay
 Bud Jamison
 Charles Stevenson (as Charles E. Stevenson)
 Sammy Brooks
 Dorothea Wolbert
 Lottie Case
 Max Hamburger
 W.L. Adams
 David Voorhees
 Fred C. Newmeyer
 Denton Vane

See also
 List of American films of 1917
 Harold Lloyd filmography

External links

1917 films
1917 comedy films
1917 short films
American silent short films
American black-and-white films
Films directed by Hal Roach
Silent American comedy films
Lonesome Luke films
American comedy short films
1910s American films
1910s English-language films